Mazha Peyyunnu Maddalam Kottunnu is a 1986 Indian Malayalam-language comedy film directed by Priyadarshan and written by Sreenivasan from a story by Jagadish. It stars an ensemble cast led by Mohanlal, Mukesh, Sreenivasan, Jagathi Sreekumar, Maniyanpilla Raju, Kuthiravattam Pappu and Lissy. Mammootty appears in a brief cameo role. The film was one of the highest-grossing Malayalam films of the year. It is now considered one of the best comedy films in Malayalam cinema. The film was remade in Telugu as Saradaga Kasepu and in Tamil as Manandhal Mahadevan (1989).

Plot
Madhavan, now liked to be known as M. A Dhavan, is back in Kerala after completing his business studies in the United States. His schoolmate Shambhu is now working as a chauffeur at his house, whom the now vain and snobbish Madhavan treats with disdain. Madhavan's parents want him to marry Shobha, the only daughter of Sardar Krishna Kurup, a wealthy and aristocratic businessman. Madhavan, who wants to observe his fiancée from a distance, decides to go to her house disguised as the driver and makes his driver Shambhu act as Madhavan.

Just minutes after they set out from their house, his parents telephone Krishna Kurup about their son's scheme. Various mishaps on way end up with Madhavan discarding his plan and deciding to visit as himself. Unaware of the change in plan, Sardar Krishna Kurup and wife have the driver Shambhu mistaken for the prospective groom and Madhavan as the driver. The prospective in-laws dote over Shambhu, ignoring Madhavan, who is unaware of the impression that Kurup and wife are under. The situation gets tougher for Madhavan, due to his innate eccentric behavior towards the Kurup family.

In the meantime Shobha, who also mistakes Shambhu as the fiancé, falls in love with him. At the same time, Sardar Koma Kurup, cousin to Sardar Krishna Kurup, is in constant fight with Krishna Kurup for past long years. Both are trying to capture the power at the Nethaji Club, a reputed social club, for personal reasons. Damodaran, a.k.a. Damu, impersonates a lawyer and enters the house of Koma Kurup and wins his trust. But the real intention of Damu is to kill Koma Kurup with the help of a doctor, making it look like an accident, and marry his daughter Aruna, so that he could grab the whole property. But one after another, the attempts of Damu to kill Koma Kurup fails, with each time, Damu getting himself nearly killed in the process. It was then, Shivan, a friend to both Damu and Shambhu, arrives at the house of Koma Kurup, apparently under the guise of Damu's imaginary brother who is apparently a heart patient. He instantly succeeds in winning the heart of Aruna, destroying the plans of Damu.

Thus the two love stories, one between Shambhu and Shobha and the other between Shivan and Aruna, blooms side by side. This chain of events pit Shambhu and Shivan against Madhavan and Damu respectively. Unable to bear Shambhu's progress, Madhavan hires Kadathanatt Pappan Gurukkal, a known goon to beat up Shambhu, but instead, the goons themselves get beaten up by the adept Shambhu. This incident makes Shambhu to go all out against Madhavan and force Krishna Kurup to conduct the marriage within three days. But, everything turns more messy as the parents of Madhavan make a surprise visit at the house of Sardar Krishna Kurup. They find the foul play of Shambhu, and Krishna Kurup, who realizes the mistake decides to get his daughter married to Madhavan.

Shobha, who by this time is in love with Shambhu is adamant that she would not marry Madhavan. The marriage venue and date are fixed. At the same time, Sardar Koma Kurup also finds out that his daughter is in love with Shivan, who is rather an adamant sickly fellow, falls for Damu's words and drive Shivan out. At the marriage venue, both Shambhu and Shivan are denied entry. They call up the police by informing that there is gold hidden by Krishna Kurup at the marriage hall. The Police enter the venue and then happens a long fight packed with several comic incidents. In the end, with the help of police inspector, Shambhu marries Shobha and Shivan marries Aruna. Everything ends well and both couples start their married life with the blessing of all others including the then dejected Madhavan and Damu.

Cast

Production
The story of this film was by Jagadish.

Soundtrack
The music was composed by K. J. Joy and the lyrics were written by 	Panthalam Sudhakaranand.

Reception
Upon release, this film was a huge hit at the box office.  Without a strong plot or any emotional scenes, it is a senseless comedy flick. It is usually categorized as one of the best comedy films to have ever happened in Malayalam cinema. The repeated telecasts on TV channels has made it a cult film.

References

External links
 

1986 films
1980s Malayalam-language films
Films with screenplays by Sreenivasan
Indian comedy films
Films directed by Priyadarshan